Rugaspidiotina is an obsolete subtribe of armored scale insects. It was established by Balachowsky in 1949 to accept those Diaspidinae which had rugaspidiotine characteristics as exemplified by genus Rugaspidiotus MacGillivray, species Rugaspidiotus arizonicus (Cockerell, 1900), and was moved from the Odonaspidini to the Diaspidini by Borchsenius. It was raised to tribe status as Rugaspidiotini. However, close examination of species assigned to the Rugaspidiotini showed that the rugaspidiotine characteristics convergently evolved in different groups of diaspidids. Rugaspidiotini and Rugaspidiotina are now regarded as obsolete groupings.

Former genera
Most of the former members of the tribe or subtribe are currently "tribally unplaced".
Adiscodiaspis
Adiscodiaspis ericicola (Marchal, 1909), tribally unplaced
Adiscodiaspis tamaricicola now Prodiaspis tamaricicola (Malenotti, 1916), tribally unplaced
Crassaspis in the Diaspidini
Discodiaspis Koroneos, 1934,  in the Diaspidini
Nimbaspis
Osiraspis
Poliaspoides now in the Kuwanaspidina
Pygalataspis
Ramachandraspis
Rugaspidiotinus
Rugaspidiotus
Rugpapuaspis

References

Lepidosaphidini